Harris "Harry" Womack (June 25, 1945 – March 9, 1974) was an American singer and musician, most notable for his tenure as a member of the family R&B quintet The Valentinos.

Biography

Early life
Harris "Harry" Womack grew up the fourth of five sons to Friendly and Naomi Womack in Cleveland's east side. The brothers were very close and they grew up affectionately attaching nicknames to one another— Harry's was "Goat.” Raised as Baptist, all five brothers began singing together when Harry was seven, forming The Womack Brothers. Like his brothers Bobby (1944–2014) and Cecil (1947–2013), Harry took up instruments, playing bass guitar before reaching his teenage years. Along with brothers Cecil and Curtis, Harry was a tenor vocalist while Bobby and Friendly, Jr. were baritones. In 1960, when he was fifteen, Sam Cooke signed the act to his SAR Records label, having told the brothers – and their father – that he was willing to work with them. Friendly Womack made Sam Cooke promise him that the brothers would continue to sing gospel and not what he referred to as "the devil's music".

Career
Following two gospel releases with SAR, Sam Cooke suggested the group change their sound and name. In 1962, Cooke renamed them The Valentinos and produced and arranged the group's first major hit, "Looking for a Love", which was led by Bobby. The record became a hit and landed them an opening spot on James Brown's Revue. Following several modestly successful R&B releases, the Valentinos' next hit, "It's All Over Now", was released in 1964. While successful on the R&B chart, the song became internationally successful after The Rolling Stones covered it and it has been covered by several bands hence.

Following Cooke's death at a L.A. motel in December 1964, SAR folded and Bobby Womack, now married to Sam Cooke's widow, Barbara, left the group for a solo career. The Valentinos briefly disbanded before regrouping as a quartet in 1966, signing with Chess Records where they recorded the Northern Soul hit, "Sweeter than the Day Before". However, the group got dropped from Chess after only two singles and Cecil Womack followed Bobby out of the group after he married Mary Wells. In 1968, the remaining trio of Harry, Curtis and Friendly Jr. signed with Jubilee Records where they recorded the Cecil-composed "Two Lovers History" before being dropped in 1970.

In 1970, Harry started accompanying brother Bobby after Bobby began his successful solo career after several years in limbo due to the scandal surrounding his marriage to Barbara Cooke, playing bass in his band. He and the other Valentinos and Cecil Womack contributed background vocals to Bobby's solo records starting with the 1970 release, My Prescription. Harry and the brothers were promptly featured in the background of Bobby's breakthrough hit, "That's the Way I Feel About Cha" as well as "Woman's Gotta Have It" from 1972. In late 1973, Harry and his brothers backed Bobby again on a remake of "Lookin' for a Love". Prior to that, the Valentinos emerged with a minor R&B hit of Bobby's "I Can Understand It", its success landing them a performing spot on the hit dance show, Soul Train.

Harry possessed an alluring, confident stage presence with the surprising ability to 'spark' a gig through "seamless" and flawless improvisation. He was very soft-spoken, warm "natured", laid back and reflective, many times those qualities were mistaken for weakness, aloofness or lack of care and concern. He had a great sense of humor and quick wit, sharing it, off stage with choice few. Being quite reclusive, his preference, when not on tour, would be to kick back, relax with friends and treat his female pet snake (named Wo), who lived in the living room of his Pasadena home, in a rather sizable fish tank, to various delectable live treats. Harry seldom drove, preferring instead the accompaniment of the groups roadie/confidant "Bill Crite", who always made himself available to the band members, on and off the road, their friendship was admirable.

1970 became an extremely busy year for the Womacks' - Bobby also squeezing in the recording of The Womack Live - Bobby Womack on the Liberty Label...Harry's strong bass line resounds throughout the album, but expressly can be heard in the cut, "The Preacher/More Than I Can Stand" which positioned #30 on Billboard R&B Charts (which was later reissued 1989 on Charity R&B) – the liner 'notes', written by their roadie Bill Crite, are as follows:  On Saturday night, in Hollywood – a monster was born! A living, breathing monster! On this night a recording was made. The artist? Bobby Womack! The monster? A collection of 9 songs, recorded live and in full color. Bobby held church that night and for all of those present, before they left, I know they felt the spirit moving into their bodies and rocking them with a whole lotta' soul. (Bill Crite). Although liner notes state the recording was made in Hollywood, it was actually recorded in the heart of Los Angeles in a small club called The Californian, now defunct, located, back then, on the N/E corner of St. Andrews Place and Santa Barbara Avenue (now Martin Luther King Blvd). While listening to the recording, there's a portion where Bobby's then manager, Ed Wright yells to Bobby, "the police said we got to go – it's 10 after 2.." (clubs were only licensed to stay open until 2am); and with Harry's bass still pulsing, Bobby didn't miss a beat, repeats the statement, then retorts, " well tell the police to come on in!" Womack attempted to wrap up, with Wright closing, "Ladies and gentleman Bobby Womack, Bobby Womack", but the house wanted more, Bobby came back and gave them one more – the police just stood at the door...listening!

In 1972 Bobby released the album Understanding. The album reached No. 43 on the Billboard pop albums chart and No. 7 on the R&B albums chart. One of the key songs from the album, "I Can Understand It", has become a soul classic and was covered by  New Birth in '73 and became a major hit for them. Bobby later produced a cover version of the cut for his brothers The Valentinos - Harry, Curtis and Friendly, Jr. The brothers sang background on the original version. The album version of "I Can Understand It" became a huge club hit and had great cross over appeal.

Bobby later described his brother as "bohemian" and "carefree". Though it was assumed that Bobby's 1973 hit, "Harry Hippie", was about him, Bobby later said that it was just a song given to him by his collaborator and friend, country singer-songwriter Jim Ford. Nonetheless, during performances of the song, Harry would do dance numbers, which caused laughter among audience members and Bobby himself. Harry's last professional recording was singing background (tenor) on Bobby's album, Lookin' for a Love Again, released in January 1974. The title track would find success for a third time after its release.

Death
Noting continuing escalation of relational problems between Harry & his girlfriend, Patricia, Bobby suggested, instead of touring, Harry stay behind, at his home for "a time-out" while he and the rest of the band went on the road to promote his new album. On the night of March 9, 1974, shortly after arriving at Bobby's; Patricia started an argument with Harry, claiming she'd found a pair of panties in the room he was occupying in Bobby's home; engulfed in rage, fueled by jealousy, Patricia grabbed a steak knife, plunging it into Harry's neck, mortally "wounding" him; the violent act, left her 7-year-old son, (from a previous union) that Harry cared for during their 6-year relationship and their 3-year-old daughter parentless. "It was a case of jealousy," said Bobby, adding that "she thought he was leaving." The undergarments later turned out to belong to a girlfriend of Bobby's. Harry is buried at Forest Lawn Memorial Park (Glendale).

The tune "Harry Hippie" penned in 1972 by Jimmy Ford for Bobby; although not written in reference to Harry, Bobby performed it as a tribute to Harry, for over 4 decades, until the day of his death in 2014. Bobby further expounded on his brother's death in an interview quote about the song and in Understanding wiki article under the Harry Hippie section. A week after Harry's death, his last recording as a background vocalist, on his brother's record "Lookin' for a Love", reached number-one on the R&B chart and number ten on the pop chart, later selling two million copies.

References

External links
 Harry Womack Find A Grave.com

1945 births
1974 deaths
1974 murders in the United States
Musicians from Cleveland
American rhythm and blues musicians
American rhythm and blues bass guitarists
American rhythm and blues singers
American soul singers
Murdered African-American people
Deaths by stabbing in California
The Valentinos members
People murdered in Los Angeles
20th-century American bass guitarists
Guitarists from Ohio
Burials at Forest Lawn Memorial Park (Glendale)
American male bass guitarists
African-American guitarists
20th-century African-American male singers